Milton Warren Jowers (July 12, 1914 – December 16, 1972) was an American football and basketball coach and college athletics administrator. He served two stints as the head football coach at Southwest Texas State University—now known as Texas State University–from 1951 to 1953 and 1961 to 1964, compiling a record of 48–18–2. Jowers was also the head basketball coach at Southwest Texas State from 1946 to 1961, tallying a mark of 287–106. He was the athletic director at Southwest Texas State from 1961 until his death on December 16, 1972, in Houston, Texas.

Head coaching record

College football

References

External links
 

1914 births
1972 deaths
American men's basketball players
Basketball coaches from Texas
Basketball players from Texas
Texas State Bobcats athletic directors
Texas State Bobcats football coaches
Texas State Bobcats football players
Texas State Bobcats men's basketball coaches
Texas State Bobcats men's basketball players
High school basketball coaches in Texas
High school football coaches in Texas
People from Caldwell County, Texas
Players of American football from Texas